Gary Collins (born January 24, 1960) is an American stock car racing driver. Now retired, he competed primarily in the NASCAR Winston West Series, however he also ran selected races in the NASCAR Winston Cup Series and NASCAR Craftsman Truck Series, and was among the drivers selected to compete in the first NASCAR exhibition race held in Australia in 1988.

Racing career
The son of Marion Collins, owner of Mesa Marin Raceway, Collins ran a total of four NASCAR Winston Cup Series races in his career; all four were combination races with the Winston West Series. His Winston Cup Series debut came at Phoenix International Raceway in the 1988 Checker 500, where he started 39th and finished 33rd in a family-owned Oldsmobile. He would run two more races at Phoenix, in 1990 and 1991, posting a best finish of 33rd in the 1990 event; his final Winston Cup start came at Sears Point International Raceway in the 1994 Save Mart Supermarkets 300, where he finished 40th while driving a Ford for Venable Racing. 

Collins was one of the drivers selected to compete in the Goodyear NASCAR 500, the first exhibition race held by NASCAR in Australia; he set the tenth fastest time in qualifying, and finished 19th in the event, crashing out on lap 80.

During the winter of 1993, Collins and his family-owned race team constructed the first-ever prototype NASCAR SuperTruck Series presented by Craftsman chassis, demonstrating that the concept, developed by Collins in conjunction with off-road racing veterans Scoop Vessels and Jim Venable, was feasible. He was one of the drivers selected to compete in the four preliminary events that established the viability of the SuperTruck Series; in the second, held at Saugus Speedway, he was flagged the winner of the event, when the race was shortened five laps before its scheduled finish due to rain. In 1995, Collins also ran four of the first six SuperTruck Series events in a family-owned No. 74 Chevrolet, posting a best finish of tenth in his final race in the series at Evergreen Speedway.

In NASCAR's lower-level series, in the Winston West Series Collins won two races of 43 he competed in between 1988 and 2001; his wins came at Mesa Marin Raceway in 1994, driving for Venable, and at Tucson Speedway in 1997 while running for his family team. his best points finish in the series came in 1995, when he finished 15th in the final standings, having competed in 7 of 15 events. Collins also ran a limited number of Featherlite Southwest Tour events, running eighteen races between 1987 and 1997, with a best finish of third at Mesa Marin in 1989.

Following his racing career, Collins joined NTS Motorsports, becoming director of competition for the team's efforts in the SRL Southwest Tour, the successor to the Featherlite Southwest Tour.

Motorsports career results

NASCAR
(key) (Bold – Pole position awarded by qualifying time. Italics – Pole position earned by points standings or practice time. * – Most laps led.)

Winston Cup Series

SuperTruck Series

References

External links

Living people
1960 births
Racing drivers from Bakersfield, California
NASCAR drivers